is a Japanese politician and diplomat who currently serves as the Secretary-General of the Liberal Democratic Party. He has previously served as Minister for Foreign Affairs from 2019 to 2021, and as Minister of Economy, Trade and Industry from 2012 to 2014. He is serving in the House of Representatives as a member of the Liberal Democratic Party. He leads the Heisei Kenkyūkai faction within the LDP.

Early life and education
A native of Ashikaga, Tochigi, Motegi was born on 7 October 1955. He graduated from the University of Tokyo in 1978 and worked for the trading company Marubeni Corporation until 1980. He received a post-graduate Master of Public Policy degree from the John F. Kennedy School of Government in 1983, and worked as a management consultant for McKinsey & Company from 1984 to 1992.

Career
He was elected to the House of Representatives for the first time in the 1993 general election as a member of the Japan New Party, representing the Tochigi 5th district.  He changed his political affiliation to the Liberal Democratic Party in 1995.

He was appointed Senior Vice-Minister for Foreign Affairs in October 2002 under Prime Minister Junichiro Koizumi. Koizumi then promoted him to Minister of State for Okinawa and Northern Territories Affairs, Science and Technology Policy, and Information Technology in September 2003, and on 1 August 2008, Prime Minister Yasuo Fukuda appointed him as State Minister in Charge of Financial Services and Administrative Reform.

Within the Liberal Democratic Party, Motegi is the acting chairman of the Takeshita faction, the party's third-largest with 52 members.

Abe government 
Following the LDP's victory in the 2012 general election, resulting in Shinzo Abe's election as prime minister, Motegi was named Minister for Economy, Trade, and Industry.

He left the Cabinet in September 2014 to serve as Chairman of the Liberal Democratic Party Election Committee. He was appointed Chairman of the LDP Policy Council in August 2016.

Motegi was appointed Minister for Economic Revitalization and State Minister for Economic and Fiscal Policy in 2017. As minister, he was sent as a special envoy to sign the Comprehensive and Progressive Agreement for Trans-Pacific Partnership in Santiago, Chile. In August 2019, Motegi led negotiations with U.S. Trade Representative Robert Lighthizer to finalize a new trade pact between Japan and the United States. Nikkei dubbed Motegi "Japan's 'Trump whisperer'" in recognition of his role in negotiating with US President Donald Trump and his administration. Abe appointed Motegi as foreign minister in September 2019 in recognition of this success.

In 2018, Motegi was revealed to have possibly breached Japan's electoral laws. He was accused of making illegal donations of incense sticks to his constituents through his personal secretary. Opposition parties called for his resignation. He was active in gathering support for Abe's re-election as president of the Liberal Democratic Party that year.

Suga and Kishida governments 

After Abe's resignation as Prime Minister, his successor Yoshihide Suga  opted to retain Motegi as foreign minister after taking office in September 2020. As Suga was known to be weak in foreign affairs, this gave Motegi an opportunity to build his reputation and brand, while maintaining the foreign policy initiatives from the Abe government.

In October 2020, Motegi met with U.K. International Trade Secretary Liz Truss to sign a bilateral economic partnership agreement estimated to raise British exports to Japan by 17.2% (¥355 billion) and Japanese exports to Britain by 79.9% (¥1.775 trillion). In the trade package, British import tariffs are expected to reduce by up to 60% for Kobe beef, 31% for the Japanese chocolate snack Pocky, 22% for bluefin tuna, 13% for udon noodles, and 6% for soy sauce.

After Suga's resignation as Prime Minister, his successor Fumio Kishida opted to retain Motegi as foreign minister after taking office in October 2021. Nikkei noted that this sent a message of continuity in Japan's policies toward China and Taiwan.

He was appointed Secretary-General of the LDP after the resignation of the previous incumbent Akira Amari following the 2021 general elections. He leads one of the main factions of the LDP party and is rumored to be a potential contender to become Prime Minister.

References

1955 births
Living people
Government ministers of Japan
Japan New Party politicians
Japanese management consultants
Japanese reporters and correspondents
Harvard Kennedy School alumni
Liberal Democratic Party (Japan) politicians
McKinsey & Company people
Members of the House of Representatives (Japan)
Politicians from Tochigi Prefecture
University of Tokyo alumni
Academic staff of Waseda University
Marubeni
21st-century Japanese politicians
Foreign ministers of Japan